The Dattilo class of offshore patrol vessels (OPVs) consists of two vessels ordered for the Italian Coast Guard.
The main mission of the OPVs is to safeguard national interests through patrolling activities and carry out anti-pollution and rescue services. The aft area is often fitted with a flight deck for the take-off and landing operations of one medium-sized helicopter. Typical features of such vessels are the extensive range as well as sea-keeping and manoeuvrability performances, which make them highly flexible from the operational point of view.

Vessels

References 

Patrol ship classes
Patrol vessels
Ships built in Castellammare di Stabia
Corps of the Port Captaincies – Coast Guard